Heather Kuzmich (born April 19, 1986) is an American fashion model. She lives in Chicago, Illinois, where she is studying video game design. She is best known for being a contestant of America's Next Top Model, Cycle 9, in which she was the ninth eliminated. During the show, it was revealed that Kuzmich has Asperger syndrome.

Personal life
Kuzmich was diagnosed with Asperger syndrome when she was fifteen years old (mistakenly reported as thirteen by Tyra Banks on ANTM), around the time her father died. She has stated in interviews that it wasn't the easiest time in her life. Living with Asperger syndrome, Kuzmich has stated that she struggles with approaching people and communication skills. Kuzmich is a member of the Seventh-day Adventist Church.

Participation in America's Next Top Model

Kuzmich was one of the final five contestants on America's Next Top Model, Cycle 9. At the beginning of the competition, some of the other contestants bullied Kuzmich, making fun of her "awkward" behavior and talking about her behind her back. However, Kuzmich later reported that "they didn't make fun of me that much" and that the show's producers chose not to broadcast more "civilized" exchanges.

According to Kuzmich, she has always wanted to model. Initially, she was hesitant about trying out for the show but finally agreed to do it after a friend convinced her to watch Cycle 7.

Kuzmich's journey began when she was the 12th woman called to participate in the final 13. Early on, she was deemed to be the underdog of the competition, but this changed when she excelled in the photo shoots. At week five in which they had to pose as fashion gargoyles, Kuzmich was called late because the judges critiqued that she only took "profile" shots. With that critique the next week, while the girls had to portray recyclable material (Kuzmich wore aluminum cans), she gave all her shots face forward, causing the panel to be blown away by her stunning features. The next week, while filming a music video for Enrique Iglesias, the artist was so taken by Kuzmich's haunting looks that he picked her and fellow contestant Lisa Jackson for featured roles, where both models were praised and were the first two called at elimination.

Eventually, Kuzmich's strong portfolio could not compensate for her Asperger syndrome, which began to affect her when having to communicate with others. During week nine, a runway challenge requiring her to speak caused her to freeze up in front of the audience and negatively affect her shoot with a burning car in the desert. Tyra Banks noted that while it was a good shot, it was her weakest.

The following week in China, Kuzmich had problems delivering her lines for the CoverGirl Queen Collection commercial. Mr. Jay noted that while she looked gorgeous, Kuzmich could not say her lines well - even when he fed them line by line. Despite taking a great CoverGirl shot, she found herself in the bottom two because of her inability to deliver, even while being given help from Mr. Jay.

She was spared for another week, but the following week saw her yet again landing in the bottom two. That week, the women went on go-sees in Shanghai, and while the other four women made it to at least three or four designers, Kuzmich got lost and ended up only making it to one. The designer praised her look and strong photographs, but criticized her runway walk as well as her lack of eye contact. She was also disqualified because of her late return. Fans were angry when fellow competitor Jenah Doucette did not offer Kuzmich a ride back because she had lost her taxi, but she explained that it was against the rules. That week, the two models who Banks deemed to take the strongest photos of the remaining women - Kuzmich and Doucette - were placed in the bottom two, both for their lack of good communication. Kuzmich was eliminated and became the ninth woman eliminated.

Kuzmich won nine CoverGirl of the Week awards, including one after she was eliminated. She also appeared on 'Top Models in Action' of ANTM cycle 12. The short clip featured her photo shoots including the cover of Spectrum magazine.

After America's Next Top Model

Modeling career

Kuzmich has signed to the women's division of Elite Model Management in Chicago and Hong Kong. A challenge win during Top Model allowed Kuzmich to participate in a special photoshoot art-directed by Mary J. Blige for Carol's Daughter.
Kuzmich also did a photoshoot for the July 2008 issue of Wedding Essentials. Kuzmich has modeled for the clothing company "Blue Eyed Girl". She has also appeared on the cover and inside of Spectrum Magazine, a magazine for families and individuals who have autism. Recently she was featured in Cycle 12.

Press
Kuzmich received great press attention due to her autism spectrum disorder, including talk show appearances (such as being interviewed on Good Morning America and an article in The New York Times). She plans to continue modeling, while continuing her education at the Illinois Institute of Art located in Chicago. In a recent interview at a viewing party, Paulina Porizkova stated that her favorite model was Kuzmich. Kuzmich has appeared in People magazine twice, once in October 2007 and the second time in December 2007. In 2008, she was one of the nine girls featured in America's Next Top Model: Exposed on the CW, during the filming of which she became close friends with Jael Strauss. She has also appeared twice on The Tyra Banks Show, once in a "Where are they now?" episode and for the Fiercee awards.

References

External links 
Heather Kuzmich Famous people with Asperger Syndrome

1986 births
Living people
Female models from Indiana
People from Valparaiso, Indiana
People with Asperger syndrome
America's Next Top Model contestants
American Seventh-day Adventists
Illinois Institute of Art – Chicago alumni